This article lists a series of political parties, both historical and contemporary as well as active and inactive, from the Republic of Moldova. The Republic of Moldova is a multi-party parliamentary republic with a unicameral system. As of 2021, in Moldova there are 45 political parties that have been formally registered.

Parliamentary parties

Main non-parliamentary parties
 Liberal Party (Partidul Liberal)
 Our Party (Partidul Nostru)
 Dignity and Truth Platform (Partidul Politic „Platforma Demnitate și Adevăr”)
 European Social Democratic Party (Partidul Social Democrat European)
 Pro Moldova (Pro Moldova)

Minor parties
Agrarian Party of Moldova (Partidul Agrar din Moldova)
Alliance for the Union of Romanians (Alianța pentru Unirea Românilor)
Christian-Democratic People's Party (Partidul Popular Creștin Democrat)
Centrist Union of Moldova (Uniunea Centristă din Moldova)
Conservative Party (Partidul Conservator)
Collective Action Party – Civic Congress (Partidul Acțiunii Comune – Congresul Civic)
Democracy at Home Party (Partidul Democrația Acasă)
Democratic Action Party (Partidul Acțiunea Democratică)
Ecologist Green Party (Partidul Verde Ecologist)
European Party (Partidul European)
Greater Moldova Party (Partidul Moldova Mare)
Liberal Democratic Party of Moldova (Partidul Liberal Democrat din Moldova)
Liberal Reformist Party (Partidul Liberal Reformator)
Moldova's Salvation Front (Frontul Salvării Moldovei”)
Mișcarea Politică Unirea (in English: Union Political Movement)
Motherland Party (Partidul „Patria”)
National Alternative Movement (Mișcarea Alternativa Națională)
National Liberal Party (Partidul Național Liberal)
National Unity Party (Partidul Unității Naționale)
New Historical Option (Noua Opțiune Istorică)
Party "Moldova Uniță" (United Moldova) (Partidul „Moldova Uniță — Единая Молдова”)
Party of Law and Justice (Partidul Legii și Dreptății)
Party of Regions of Moldova (Partidul Regiunilor din Moldova)
Party "Our Home – Moldova" (Partidul „Casa Noastră — Moldova”)
Party "Patriots of Moldova" (Partidul „Patrioţii Moldovei”)
Party "The Will of the People" (Partidul „Voința Poporului”)
People's Democratic Party of Moldova (Partidul Popular Democrat din Moldova)
People's Movement Antimafia (Mișcarea Populară Antimafie)
People's Party of the Republic of Moldova (Partidul Popular din Republica Moldova)
People's Socialist Party of Moldova (Partidul Popular Socialist din Moldova)
Professionals' Movement Speranta-Nadejda (Mișcarea Profesioniştilor „Speranța-Nadejda”)
Progressive Society Party (Partidul Societăţii Progresiste)
Republican Party of Moldova (Partidul Republican din Moldova)
Revival Party (Partidul „Renaștere”)
Russian-Slavic Party of Moldova (Partidul Ruso-Slavean din Moldova)
Social and Political Movement "New Force" (Mișcarea social-politică „Forța Noua”)
Social Democratic Party (Partidul Social-Democrat)
Socialist Party of Moldova (Partidul Socialist din Moldova)
Socio-political Movement of Romanies of the Republic of Moldova (Mişcarea social-politică a Romilor din Republica Moldova)
Working People's Party (Partidului Oamenilor Muncii)

Former parties
Communist Reformist Party (Partidul Comunist Reformator). Founded in 2014, it has participated at the 2014 parliamentary elections, gaining 4.92% of votes. It failed to register at for the 2015 local elections. Subsequently, in February 2016, its legal registration status was cancelled by the Moldovan justice.
European Action Movement (Mișcarea Acţiunea Europeană, merged into the Liberal Party) 
Our Moldova Alliance (Alianța „Moldova Noastră”, merged into the Liberal Democratic Party of Moldova)
Social Liberal Party (Partidul Social-Liberal, merged into Democratic Party of Moldova)
Social Democracy Party (Partidul Democrației Sociale, merged with the Social Democratic Party of Moldova)

Historical political parties
Bessarabian Peasants' Party (Partidul Țărănesc din Basarabia)
Communist Party of Moldova (Partidul Comunist al Moldovei) 
Democratic Agrarian Party (Partidul Democrat Agrar)
Democratic Union of Freedom (Uniunea Democratică a Libertăţii)
Freedom Party, Bessarabia (Partidul Libertăţii)
Gagauz Khalky, Gagauz separatist, now outlawed
National Moldavian Party (Partidul Național Moldovenesc)
National Patriotic Front (Partidul Național Patriotic)

Party alliances
 Alliance for Democracy and Reforms 
 Alliance for European Integration
 Alliance for European Integration III
 Electoral Bloc Democratic Moldova 
 Electoral Bloc Motherland 
 Political Alliance for a European Moldova
 Pro-European Coalition

Political camps
Two major movements have developed in the recent years in Moldovan politics and they can be distinguished as follows:
 On the one hand, a pro-Western world, pro-Moldovan–Romanian unionism, and pro-Europeanist, generally comprising conservative liberals.
 On the other hand, a Russophilian, pro-Communist or pro-Usatîi, generally Eurosceptic, and often anti-American and strongly anti-liberal group of parties.

See also
 List of political parties in Transnistria
 Lists of political parties
 List of ruling political parties by country

References

External links
Lista partidelor politice din Moldova

Moldova
 
Political parties
Political parties
Moldova